Guanylate binding protein family member 6 is a protein that in humans is encoded by the GBP6 gene.

Function

Guanylate-binding proteins, such as GBP6, are induced by interferon and hydrolyze GTP to both GDP and GMP (Olszewski et al., 2006 [PubMed 16689661]).

References

Further reading